Zolotinka is an urban locality (an urban-type settlement) in Neryungrinsky District of the Sakha Republic, Russia, located  from Neryungri, the administrative center of the district, in the southern reaches of the Aldan Highlands, on the Kholodnikan River, close to where it flows into the Iyengra, a tributary of the Timpton. As of the 2010 Census, its population was 552.

Etymology
The name "Zolotinka", which literally means a gold flake in Russian, refers to the gold reserves found in the area.

History
Zolotinka was founded in the mid-1970s in conjunction with the construction of the railway linking the Baikal–Amur Mainline to the town of Neryungri. Urban-type settlement status was granted to it in 1977. With the completion of the railway, and gold mining activities not as successful as it had been hoped, the majority of inhabitants left during the 1980s.

Administrative and municipal status
Within the framework of administrative divisions, the urban-type settlement of Zolotinka is incorporated within Neryungrinsky District as the Settlement of Zolotinka. As a municipal division, the territories of the Settlement of Zolotinka and the Settlement of Nagorny are incorporated within Neryungrinsky Municipal District as Zolotinka Urban Settlement.

Transportation
Zolotinka has a railway station on the Amur–Yakutsk Mainline.

References

Notes

Sources
Official website of the Sakha Republic. Registry of the Administrative-Territorial Divisions of the Sakha Republic. Neryungrinsky District. 

Urban-type settlements in the Sakha Republic